The Serious Moonlight Tour was a worldwide concert tour by English musician David Bowie, launched in May 1983 in support of his album Let's Dance (1983). The tour opened at the Vorst Forest Nationaal, Brussels, on 18 May 1983 and ended in the Hong Kong Coliseum on 8 December 1983; 15 countries visited, 96 performances, and over 2.6 million tickets sold. The tour garnered mostly favourable reviews from the press.
It was, at the time, his longest, largest and most successful concert tour to date, although it has since been surpassed in length, attendance and gross revenue by subsequent Bowie tours.

Background and development
In 1980, David Bowie had released his album Scary Monsters (and Super Creeps), at the time expecting to support the album with a tour. However, the murder of John Lennon in December 1980 deeply affected Bowie and as a result, he cancelled his tour plans and withdrew to his home in Switzerland where he became a recluse and continued working. Consequently, the Serious Moonlight Tour was Bowie's first tour in 5 years.

This tour, designed to support Bowie's latest album Let's Dance, was initially designed to be a smaller tour, playing to the likes of sub-10,000-seat indoor venues around the world, similar to previous Bowie tours. However, the success of Let's Dance caused unexpectedly high demand for tickets: there were 250,000 requests for 44,000 tickets at one show, for example, and as a result the tour was changed to instead play in a variety of larger outdoor and festival-style venues. The largest crowd for a single show during the tour was 80,000 in Auckland, New Zealand, while the largest crowd for a festival date was 300,000 at the US 83 Festival in California. The tour sold out at every venue it played.

Bowie used boxing (of which he was a fan) to get in shape for the tour. His son Duncan Jones pointed out years later that "Each round [of boxing] is approximately the same length as a song, so if you can get your cardio up enough to do a full 12 or so rounds, you’re ready to go!"

Set design
Initially, Bowie worked with Derek Boshier to design the stage for the tour, as Boshier had designed the artwork for the Let's Dance album itself. The design proposed by Boshier was an "extravagant design reminiscent of the Diamond Dogs set with multiple platforms and levels, rotating prisms revealing different backdrop designs on each facet, and a gigantic cartoon figure of Bowie with a guitar", but this was rejected as too expensive, so instead Bowie worked with Mark Ravitz to come up with what was the final design, which included four giant columns (affectionately referred to as "condoms") as well as a large moon and a giant hand. Ravitz had designed the set for Bowie's 1974 Diamond Dogs Tour, and would work on Bowie's next touring set as well, the 1987 Glass Spider Tour.

The Serious Moonlight stage was deliberately given a vertical feeling (especially due to the columns) and an overall design that Bowie called a combination of classicism and modernism. The weight of one set (of which there were two) was 32 tons. Lighting the set were 40 Vari-Lites, some of which were set horizontally across the stage, which allowed them to "create set-piece landscapes" for certain songs.

Tour rehearsals and musicians

Bowie used the musicians he'd newly collaborated with on Let's Dance, along with some longer standing collaborators, including Carlos Alomar who was the designated tour band leader. Stevie Ray Vaughan, who had contributed guitar solos to six of the songs on Let's Dance and who was up and coming, was to join the tour, also to please the American audience. Early rehearsals were held in Manhattan without Vaughan and Bowie, and were overseen by Alomar. Rehearsals moved to Las Calinas, Texas in April, where Bowie and Vaughan joined the band, but Vaughan showed up with a cocaine habit, a hard-partying wife and an entourage looking for easy access to drugs. Given that Bowie himself had moved to Berlin in the late 1970s to try and kick his own cocaine habit, Bowie and Vaughan's management failed to come to an agreement on how to temper the situation, and in the end Vaughan pulled out of the tour. Bassist Carmine Rojas called Vaughan's release "one of the most heartbreaking moments he had ever witnessed on the road, Stevie left standing on the sidewalk with his bags surrounding him." Bowie, who was in Europe promoting the album and tour when the disagreement arose, did not have a say in Vaughan's departure. This happened less than one week before the tour's opening night, and as a result, Vaughan's replacement Earl Slick spent the next few days in his hotel room, learning all of the 31 songs on the setlist.

Each band member wore a costume which was designed "down to the smallest detail", as if a character in a play. Two sets of each person's costumes were made and worn on alternate nights, and everyone got to keep one set at the conclusion of the tour as a souvenir. The bands' costumes were a nod, a "slight parody", on all the New Romantic bands that were growing in popularity at the time.

Song selection
Faced with high demand for tickets for the tour, Bowie decided to play his more recognizable songs from his repertoire, saying a few years later that his goal was to give the fans the songs that they'd heard on the radio over the past 15 years, calling the setlist a collection of songs that the fans "probably didn't realize when added up are a great body of work". Bowie and Carlos Alomar selected an initial list of songs for the tour, 35 of which they rehearsed for the tour. One song that was on the rehearsal's song list that never actually got to the rehearsal stage was "Across the Universe", which Bowie had covered in 1975 on his Young Americans album. The setlist for the tour was the basis for the track list for the 1989 box set Sound + Vision. Some of Bowie's less well-known songs, such as "Joe the Lion" and "Wild Is the Wind" were performed only on early dates of the tour.

Tour performances

Various artists opened for Bowie across different legs, including UB40, Icehouse, The Tubes, The Beat and Peter Gabriel. To counteract counterfeiting, tickets and backstage passes were printed with small flaws that casual observers would not notice, but tour staff and security were trained to spot.

On 30 June 1983, the performance at the Hammersmith Odeon in London was a charity show for the Brixton Neighbourhood Community Association in the presence of Princess Michael of Kent. The show raised nearly £100,000 for charity (about £ in today's currency), and was performed without the standard set. The 13 July 1983 Montreal Forum performance was recorded and broadcast on American FM radio and other radio stations worldwide, and it was from this concert that the live version of "Modern Love" was recorded. The concert on 12 September in Vancouver was recorded for the concert video Serious Moonlight, that was released in 1984 and on DVD in 2006. There were discussions to release a live CD from these performances as well, but that idea was later discarded.

At the Canadian National Exhibition Stadium performance on 4 September 1983 in Toronto, Bowie introduced special guest Mick Ronson, who borrowed Earl Slick's guitar and performed "The Jean Genie" with Bowie and band. Mick had only been asked to play the day before when he had been backstage at the previous night's show, and he later recalled:

The last show of the tour, on 8 December 1983, was the third anniversary of John Lennon's death, whom Bowie and Slick had previously worked with in the studio. Slick suggested to Bowie a few days prior to the show that they play "Across the Universe" as a tribute; but Bowie said, "Well if we're going to do it, we might as well do 'Imagine'." They rehearsed the song a couple of times on 5 December (in Bangkok) and then performed the song on the final night of the tour as a tribute to their friend.

Legacy
The tour was a commercial high point for Bowie, who found his new popularity perplexing. He later remarked that, with the success of Let's Dance and the Serious Moonlight Tour, he lost track of who his fans were or what they wanted. One critic would later call this tour his "most accessible" because "it had few props and one costume change, from peach suit to blue."

"The 'Blond Ambition' tour, as we ended up calling it, in 1984 [sic] was pretty good," Bowie conceded in 2003. "We'd booked it before everything went huge and it really was quite innovative. It was the first big theatrical-show-type tour there had been. Madonna and Prince came to see it and it had an influence."

The 26 November show in Auckland became – at the time – the most attended concert in the Southern Hemisphere with over 80,000 people in attendance.

Bowie specifically tried to avoid repeating the Serious Moonlight Tour's successful formula for his 1987 Glass Spider Tour.

Set list
This is the set list from the performance in Vancouver, Canada, on 12 September 1983. It's not intended to represent all shows throughout the tour.

 "Look Back in Anger"
 "Heroes"
 "What in the World"
 "Golden Years"
 "Fashion"
 "Let's Dance"
 "Breaking Glass"
 "Life on Mars?"
 "Sorrow"
 "Cat People (Putting Out Fire)"
 "China Girl"
 "Scary Monsters (And Super Creeps)"
 "Rebel Rebel"
 "White Light/White Heat"
 "Station to Station"
 "Cracked Actor"
 "Ashes to Ashes"
 "Space Oddity"
 "Young Americans"
 "Fame"
 "TVC 15"
Encore
 "Star"
 "Stay"
 "The Jean Genie"
 "Modern Love"

Personnel
David Bowie – lead vocals, guitar, saxophone
Earl Slick – guitar
Carlos Alomar – guitar, backing vocals, music director
Carmine Rojas – bass guitar
Tony Thompson – drums, percussion
Dave Lebolt – keyboards, synthesizers
Steve Elson – saxophones
Stan Harrison – saxophones, woodwinds
Lenny Pickett – saxophones, woodwinds
George Simms – backing vocals
Frank Simms – backing vocals

Tour dates

Song list

From David Bowie
 "Space Oddity"
From Hunky Dory
 "Life on Mars?"
From The Rise and Fall of Ziggy Stardust and the Spiders From Mars
 "Soul Love"
 "Star"
 "Hang On to Yourself"
From Aladdin Sane
 "Cracked Actor"
 "The Jean Genie"
From Pin Ups
 "I Can't Explain" (originally a non-album single (1965) by The Who; written by Pete Townshend)
 "Sorrow" (originally by The McCoys in 1965 and made famous by The Merseys the following year; written by Bob Feldman, Jerry Goldstein and Richard Gottehrer)
From Diamond Dogs
 "Rebel Rebel"
From Young Americans
 "Young Americans"
 "Fame" (Bowie, John Lennon, Carlos Alomar)
From Station to Station
 "Station to Station"
 "Golden Years"
 "TVC 15"
 "Stay"
 "Wild Is the Wind" (originally a single by Johnny Mathis, written by Dimitri Tiomkin and Ned Washington)

From Low
 "Breaking Glass" (Bowie, Dennis Davis, George Murray)
 "What in the World"
From "Heroes"
 "Joe the Lion"
 "Heroes" (Bowie, Brian Eno)
From Lodger
 "Red Sails" (Bowie, Eno)
 "Look Back in Anger" (Bowie, Eno)
From Scary Monsters (and Super Creeps)
 "Scary Monsters (and Super Creeps)"
 "Ashes to Ashes"
 "Fashion"
From Let's Dance
 "Modern Love"
 "China Girl" (originally from The Idiot (1977) by Iggy Pop; written by Pop and Bowie)
 "Let's Dance"
 "Cat People (Putting Out Fire)" (originally from the Cat People soundtrack (1982); written by Bowie and Giorgio Moroder)
Other songs:
 "Imagine" (originally from Imagine (1971) by John Lennon; written by Lennon)
 "White Light/White Heat" (from White Light/White Heat (1968) by The Velvet Underground; written by Lou Reed)

Notes

References

 David Buckley, Strange Fascination: The Definitive Biography of David Bowie, Virgin Books, 1999, 

David Bowie concert tours
1983 concert tours